Fabeltjeskrant (or De Fabeltjeskrant, Dutch for "The Fables Newspaper") is a Dutch children's television series featuring puppetry and stop motion. From 1973 to 1975 it was broadcast also in the United Kingdom, on ITV, with the title The Daily Fable.

Plot
Each episode is based upon fables of Jean de La Fontaine, Aesop, Phaedrus and also by the series' scenographer Leen Valkenier. The main character, the owl "Meneer de Uil", introduces each episode reading a fable to other characters upon a tree. The setting is a forest inhabited by different anthropomorphic felt animals. The first episode was broadcast on 29 September 1968 on NOS.

Characters

Main characters
All character surnames are referred to their species.
Meneer de Uil (Mr. Owl), or Jacob de Uil, is an owl and the main narrator and face of the series. In British version his name was "Mr. Owl".
Juffrouw Ooievaar (Miss Stork in the British version)
Lowieke de Vos (Mr. Cunningham in the British version)
Crox de Raaf (or Meneer de Raaf) (Mr. Crow in the British version, in Dutch he is a raven)
Bor de Wolf (Boris the Wolf in the British version)
Ed Bever (Fred Beaver in the British version) 
Willem Bever (Bert Beaver in the British version)
Zoef de Haas (Zippy the Hare in the British version)
Stoffel de Schildpad (Shelly the Tortoise in the British version)
Truus de Mier (Miss Ant in the British version) 
Gerrit de Postduif (Gerald the Pigeon in the British version) 
Meindert het Paard (Milord the Horse in the British version) 
Droes de Beer (Harold the Bear in the British version) 
Jodocus de Marmot (George the Guinea Pig in the British version) 
Isadora Paradijsvogel 
Myra Hamster
Martha Hamster
Momfer de Mol
Chico Lama
Greta Bontekoe
Zaza Zebra
Woefdram

Later generation characters
These character were not part of the first three series.
Fatima de Poes, Iranian Muslima cat wearing a hijab only appeared in the theater show (2007) 
Wally Windhond, (2019) DJ Dog both voice and music are done by Armin van Buuren 
Peter Panda (2019)

Recurring characters from the first two series
Tijl Schavuit and Sjefke Schelm, two dodgy characters that first starred in the 70s feature film and then became recurring characters
Piet de Pad
Oléta Vulpécula
Teun Stier
Snoespoes
Woef Hektor
Hondje Woef
Greta 2
Borita
Harry Lepelaar
"Mister" John Maraboe
Blinkert de Bliek and his girlfriend Frija Forel
Melis Das
Pepijn de Kater
Plons de Kikvors

In other countries
The show was adapted in some other countries under the following titles:
France: Le petit écho de la Forêt (French for The Little Echo of the Forest)
Hungary: Fabulácskahírek (Hungarian for The Fables Newspaper)
Israel: Sipurimpo (Hebrew for Stories Here)
Italy: La fiaba quotidiana (Italian for The daily fairy tale)
Norway: Fablenes bok (Norwegian for The book of Fables)
Sweden: Fablernas värld (Swedish for World of Fables)
United Kingdom: The Daily FablePeru: Las Crónicas de Fabulandia (Spanish for Chronicles of Fableland)
Mexico: Las Crónicas de Fabulandia (Spanish for Chronicles of Fableland)
Japan: "Fachishu shinbun" (Japanese for  "The animals of Fables village")
Poland: Leśna gazetka (Polish for "Forest newspaper")

In Sweden, France, and the United Kingdom, the show was refilmed especially for those specific countries. The Hebrew and Italian versions were dubbings of the English adaptation.

Adaptations
Lex Overeijnder wrote and drew a short-lived newspaper comic strip based on the TV show in 1969. In 1975 Dick Vlottes created another comic strip based on the series, which was published in the TV magazine Televizier in 1975.

In 1970, a film version, Onkruidzaaiers in Fabeltjesland, premiered in theaters.

In 2007 a musical adaptation was created by Ruud de Graaf and Hans Cornelissen.

Comeback
In November 2017, a new 3D animated series was announced. It was broadcast in 2019 on Netflix in the Netherlands.

In 2018 a book, an exhibition and a movie were launched to celebrate the 50th anniversary.

See also
 Sesamstraat'' (another Dutch children's television series featuring puppetry)

Notes and references

External links
 
  
 

Dutch children's television series
1960s Dutch television series
1968 Dutch television series debuts
1989 Dutch television series endings
1960s animated television series
1970s animated television series
1980s animated television series
Dutch television shows featuring puppetry
Stop-motion animated television series
ITV children's television shows
Dutch-language television shows
Animated television series about birds
Television shows adapted into comics
Television shows adapted into plays
Television shows adapted into films
1960s preschool education television series 
1970s preschool education television series 
1980s preschool education television series 
Animated preschool education television series
Forests in fiction